Dobrogea Veche is a commune in Sîngerei District, Moldova. It is composed of three villages: Cotovca, Dobrogea Nouă and Dobrogea Veche.

References

Communes of Sîngerei District